The men's middleweight (87 kilograms) event at the 2014 Asian Games took place on 30 September 2014 at Ganghwa Dolmens Gymnasium, Incheon, South Korea.

A total of twelve competitors from twelve countries competed in this event, limited to fighters whose body weight was less than 87 kilograms.

Jasur Baykuziyev from Uzbekistan won the gold medal after defeating Chen Linglong from People's Republic of China in the gold medal match by the score of 6–3.

The bronze medal was shared by semifinal losers (without having a third place match) Nattapat Tantramart of Thailand and Shin Yeong-rae from the host nation South Korea.

Schedule
All times are Korea Standard Time (UTC+09:00)

Results

References

External links
Official website

Taekwondo at the 2014 Asian Games